Kof-K, a Teaneck, NJ-based Kosher certification agency, is one of the "Big Five."

As of 2010, more than one third of all food sold in the United States has kosher supervision, 80% of it from one of the "Big Five."

Its founder and rabbinic administrator was Rabbi Dr. Harvey (Zecharia) Senter, who died April 4, 2021 (אחרון של פסח).

While the Kof-K's certification is largely for products, they also certify kosher eateries.

See also
 Hechsher

References

Kosher food certification organizations